Zhang Ying (Chinese: 张崟; 1761–1829) was a famed calligrapher and painter of Qing Dynasty China. A native Dantu (now Zhenjiang, Jiangsu Province), he belonged to the Dantu School.

His style name was 'Bao Yan' and his sobriquet was 'Xi An'. He was talented in painting landscapes which were done with a desolated and free atmosphere.

References

1761 births
1829 deaths
Qing dynasty landscape painters
Qing dynasty calligraphers
Painters from Zhenjiang